The Nicaraguan Chess Championship is currently organized by Fenanic, the national chess federation of Nicaragua. After the first championship was held as a match in 1956, subsequent editions have been held as tournaments in multiple categories, with the winner of the top category becoming the national champion.

National championship winners
{| class="sortable wikitable"
! Year !! National champion || Notes
|-
| 1956 ||  || Arellano beat Gustavo Montalván in a series of seven games.
|-
| 1958 || Julio Ramírez de Arellano || 
|-
| 1959 || Julio Ramírez de Arellano || 
|-
| 1960 || Julio Ramírez de Arellano || 
|-
| 1961 || Julio Ramírez de Arellano || 
|-
| 1962 || Julio Ramírez de Arellano || 
|-
| 1964 || Julio Ramírez de Arellano || 
|-
| 1965 || Julio Ramírez de Arellano || 
|-
| 1966 || Julio Ramírez de Arellano || 
|-
| 1967 || Julio Ramírez de Arellano || 
|-
| 1968 || Julio Ramírez de Arellano || 
|-
| 1969 || Gustavo Jorge Aleman || 
|-
| 1970 ||  || 
|-
| 1971 || Gustavo Jorge Aleman || 
|-
| 1972 || Miguel Chávez || 
|-
| 1973 || Narciso Salas Chávez || Benjamín Zapata was leading the tournament but was disqualified in the penultimate round for showing up to play while intoxicated.
|-
| 1974 || Carlos J. Lau || Lau finished third in the tournament, while Julio Ramírez de Arellano and Francisco Castillo Tamariz tied for first and began a playoff match for the title. When they protested that the chess clock they were using was not working properly, FENANIC disqualified them both and awarded the title to Lau.
|- 
| 1975 || René Pilarte Tijerino || 
|-
| 1976 || Francisco Castillo Tamariz || 
|-
| 1977–1980 || – || Not held because of the Nicaraguan Revolution.
|-
| 1981 || Edmundo Dávila Castellón || Mexican IM Roberto Navarro won the tournament off-contest. Dávila Castellón won the national championship as the Nicaraguan with the best result.
|-
| 1982 || Danilo Canda || Canda won on tiebreaks ahead of Dávila Castellón.
|-
| 1983 || Martín Guevara || 
|-
| 1984 || Martín Guevara || 
|-
| 1985 || Martín Guevara || 
|-
| 1986 || Martín Guevara || 
|-
| 1987 || José Luis Fonseca || 
|-
| 1988 || Martín Guevara || 
|-
| 1989 || ? || Martín Guevara finished second.
|-
| 1990 || Martín Guevara || 
|-
| 1991 || René Lacayo || 
|-
| 1992 || Martín Guevara || 
|-
| 1993 || Martín Guevara || 
|-
| 1994 || Carlos Dávila || 
|- 
| 1995 || Carlos Dávila || 
|-
| 1996 || Carlos Dávila || 
|-
| 1997 || René Pilarte Tijerino || 
|- 
| 1998 || Carlos Dávila || 
|- 
| 1999 || Rodolfo Izabá || 
|-
| 2000 || René Lacayo || 
|-
| 2001 || Carlos Guevara || 
|-
| 2002 || René Lacayo || 
|-
| 2003 || René Lacayo || 
|-
| 2004 || Félix Espinoza || Espinoza won on tiebreaks over Carlos Dávila.
|-
| 2005 || Carlos Dávila || 
|-
| 2006 || Carlos Dávila || 
|-
| 2007 || Carlos Dávila || Dávila beat Jorge Luis Picado in a playoff for first.
|-
| 2008 || Félix Espinoza || 
|-
| 2009 || Maximiliano Rocha || Rocha beat Martin Guevara and William Bravo in a three-way playoff for first.
|-
| 2010 || René Lacayo || Lacayo finished ahead of José Luis Fonseca on tiebreaks.
|-
| 2011 || René Lacayo || 
|-
| 2012 || William Bravo || Salvadoran IM  won the tournament off-contest. Bravo, who finished second, won the national championship as the Nicaraguan with the best result.
|-
| 2013 || Marcos Ortiz || 
|-
| 2014 || Carlos Guevara || Guevara won on tiebreaks ahead of Ricardo García and Marcos Ortiz.
|-
| 2015 || William Bravo || 
|- 
| 2016 || Juan José Pineda || 
|- 
| 2017 || René Lacayo || 
|- 
| 2018 || René Lacayo || 
|-
| 2019 || René Lacayo || 
|-
| 2020 || René Lacayo || 
|}

References

Chess in Nicaragua
Chess national championships
Chess championship
Recurring sporting events established in 1956
Chess championship
1956 in chess